Estadio Guillermo Albornoz is a multi-use stadium in Cayambe, Ecuador.  It is currently used mostly for football matches and is the home stadium of Cuniburo Fútbol Club.  The stadium holds 12,000 people.

External links
Stadium information

Olímpico Guillermo Albornoz
Buildings and structures in Pichincha Province